Fresno Chandler Executive Airport  is a public use airport  west of the central business district of Fresno, California, United States. It is owned by the City of Fresno and managed by the city’s Airports Division.

Chandler Airport opened in November 1929 and served as Fresno’s primary airport for civil and commercial aviation until 1948.

History 
Fresno Chandler Executive Airport is one of the oldest operational airports in California. Its history stretches back to the end of World War I. At the time, there were no facilities for aviation in the Fresno area. Recognizing the problem, husband and wife Wilber F. Chandler and Edna Maria Goble allowed pilots to take off and land in their fields once the crops were harvested. Pilots called the site "Chandler Field."

Efforts to raise funds for a permanent aviation field in Fresno started in the early 1920s. One notable fundraiser was the "World's Greatest Aerial Circus" held at the Chandler farm on the afternoon of Thanksgiving Day 1923, featuring races, parachute jumps and dual wing walking.

In 1929, the Chandler family donated 100 acres of land to the city to be used as a public-use airfield. The site was named after the family and opened as Chandler Air Field in November 1929. The airport was used by both civil and commercial aviation.

On March 23, 1930, Charles Lindbergh and his wife landed briefly at the airport and were greeted by a crowd of 20,000.

The Works Progress Administration (WPA) funded the construction of the airport terminal and administration building along with other support buildings in 1936. , the building still stands and remains in active use. It is considered to be one of the most intact WPA funded airports in the United States. The WPA also extended Chandler's runway to 4,000 feet in 1938. However, despite the investments, it was already clear that the small facility would not be able to accommodate the increasingly larger airplanes used by the commercial airlines.

In early 1941, shortly before the United States officially entered World War II, the United States Army Air Corps Southwest Air District took over the airport while nearby Hammer Field was being built. Hammer Field opened in June 1942 and all military activity moved there.

After the end of the war, Hammer Field was inactivated by the Army Air Forces, and in 1946 the War Assets Administration reallocated the property to the city of Fresno. The now civilian airport re-opened in 1948 as the Fresno Air Terminal (FAT) (it has since been renamed the Fresno Yosemite International Airport). Trans World Airlines (TWA) and United Airlines flights to San Francisco/Oakland and Los Angeles moved from Chandler Field to the newly opened airport.

After the move, Chandler Airport was designated as a reliever airport for Fresno Yosemite International Airport and has been marketed as an executive airport located closer to Downtown Fresno.

Facilities and aircraft 

For the 12-month period ending May 9, 2017 the airport had 24,885 general aviation aircraft operations, an average of 68 per day. At that time there were 124 aircraft based at this airport: 83% single-engine, 7% ultralight, 6% multi-engine, 4% helicopter, and 1% jet.

See also

 California World War II Army Airfields

References 

 www.airfieldsdatabase.com

External links 
 
 

Airports in Fresno County, California
San Joaquin Valley
Airfields of the United States Army Air Forces in California